William Andrew White, III,  (February 7, 1915 – January 23, 1981) was a Canadian composer and social justice activist, who was the first Black Canadian to run for federal office in Canada.

Family and education
He was born in 1915 in Truro, Nova Scotia, the son of Baptist minister William A. White and his wife Izie Dora (White). (They were not related before marriage.)  Among his twelve siblings were internationally renowned Canadian concert singer Portia White, labour union leader and politician Jack White, and television performer Lorne White. Another sister married a Mr. Oliver, and they were the parents of Donald H. Oliver, the first black Canadian Senator.

His family moved to Halifax where his father was minister of the   Church for nearly 20 years. After attending local schools, he got an education and music degree. He taught music. He was also a composer and choral group leader.

Marriage and family
Bill White and his wife Vivian had children including software designer W. Romney White, folk musician Chris White, Toronto physician Laurie White, social activist and politician Sheila White, and professional musician Tim White.

1949 federal election
White stood as the Co-operative Commonwealth Federation candidate in the Toronto electoral district of Spadina in the 1949 election. He was defeated.

Order of Canada
Bill White was appointed an Officer of the Order of Canada on December 18, 1970. He was invested into the Order on March 31, 1971. The appointment was for "services to the community and his contribution to better relations and understanding between people of different racial background." Another honour he earned was the Scarborough Citizen of the Year in 1976.

Death
Bill White died in New Zealand on January 23, 1981, local time (January 23 in Toronto's Eastern Time Zone).

See also
Electoral firsts in Canada

References

1915 births
1981 deaths
Black Canadian politicians
Black Canadian musicians
Black Nova Scotians
Canadian people of American descent
Canadian people of African-American descent
Canadian Unitarians
Musicians from Nova Scotia
Officers of the Order of Canada
Ontario candidates for Member of Parliament
People from Scarborough, Toronto
People from Truro, Nova Scotia
20th-century Canadian male musicians
Co-operative Commonwealth Federation candidates for the Canadian House of Commons